Gerald Smitherman  (born in Telford, England) is a former motorcycle speedway rider in British League and National League (speedway).

Career
The year 1972 saw Gerald seeking rides at the start of his career, taking second half rides for the experience and a couple of outings with teams. His career took off properly when he was signed for Ellesmere Port Gunners where he stayed for 4 years, returning decent averages in the middle ranks. In his final year, he was signed over to Oxford Cheetahs to promoter Harry Bastable

After speedway
During his time as a rider, he had also made seats and continued with supplying accessories after retiring as GTS Products. For the 1991 World Speedway Final, he made the suits for Sam Ermolenko, Ronnie Corrie, Billy Hamill, Jan O. Pedersen and Per Jonson as well as pit crews. Married to Sherry, they have four daughters. Gerald took up squash, winning an Over-45 championship. He still follows speedway and provides accessories for today's riders as well as retro items.

References

External links
 https://wwosbackup.proboards.com/thread/2596
 http://www.speedwayplus.com/Gunners2010.shtml
 https://www.cradleyspeedway.co.uk/riders.htm
 https://www.cheshire-live.co.uk/sport/other-sport/kings-men-together-again-5299398
 http://www.defunctspeedway.co.uk/ellesmere%20port%20speedway.htm
 https://www.classicspeedwayandgrasstrack.com/ongoing-projects/ (reference to GTS Products in article)
 https://www.speedwayresearcher.org.uk/cradleyheath1972.pdf Smitherman riding for Cradley Juniors)
 https://www.edinburghmonarchs.co.uk/match-centre/fixture/1977-06-03/edinburgh/oxford 

1952 births
English motorcycle racers
British speedway riders
Cradley Heathens riders
Oxford Cheetahs riders
Ellesmere Port Gunners riders
Living people